Wei Zhouzuo (1612–1675), courtesy name Wenxi, art name Wenshi, was an official who served in the late Ming dynasty and early Qing dynasty. He was a native of Chengnei (城內). He took the imperial examination and obtained a jinshi degree in 1637 during the reign of the Chongzhen Emperor.

After the fall of the Ming dynasty, Wei served under the Qing in various capacities.  In 1653, he was named Vice-President of Punishments, in 1654 President of Works, and in 1658 President of Civil Appointments, as well as Grand Secretary.  In 1660 he worked with the Qing noble Bahana to revise the Great Qing Legal Code.

References

1612 births
1675 deaths
Grand Secretaries of the Qing dynasty
Ming dynasty people
Qing dynasty people
Chinese jurists